Makardhokada Dam, is an earthfill dam on Amb river near Umred, Nagpur district in state of Maharashtra in India.

Specifications

Purpose
 Irrigation

See also
 Dams in Maharashtra
 List of reservoirs and dams in India

References

Dams in Nagpur district
Dams completed in 1978
1978 establishments in Maharashtra